Shackled is a 1918 American silent drama film directed by Reginald Barker and starring Louise Glaum, Charles West and John Gilbert.

Cast
 Louise Glaum as Lola Dexter
 Charles West as Walter Cosgrove
 John Gilbert as James Ashley 
 Roberta Wilson as Edith Danfield
 Lawson Butt as Thomas Danfield 
 Herschel Mayall as Henry Hartman
 Roy Laidlaw as Major Duval

References

Bibliography
 B. Connelly, Robert. The Silents: Silent Feature Films, 1910-36, Volume 40, Issue 2. December Press, 1998.

External links
 

1918 films
1918 drama films
1910s English-language films
American silent feature films
Silent American drama films
American black-and-white films
Films directed by Reginald Barker
Films distributed by W. W. Hodkinson Corporation
1910s American films
English-language drama films